A Good Snowman Is Hard To Build is a puzzle video game created by Alan Hazelden and Benjamin Davis. The game was released in 2015 for personal computers and mobile devices.

Gameplay
A Good Snowman Is Hard To Build is a grid-based puzzle video game similar to Sokoban that tasks players with helping a featureless monster to build snowmen. Snowmen are built by stacking three snowballs of decreasing size. Rolling small or medium-sized balls over snowy ground increases their size. Building all snowmen in a room unlocks adjacent rooms which are all part of a hedge maze.

Players can undo one move at a time or reset a room.

Development and release
A Good Snowman Is Hard To Build was created by UK-based independent developers Alan Hazelden and Benjamin Davis. Its prototype was developed using Puzzlescript, an open-source HTML5 puzzle game engine, in 2014. The commercial release was written in Haxe and OpenFL and released for Linux, OS X, and Windows-based personal computers on 25 February 2015. A version for Android and iOS mobile devices was released on 9 December 2015.

Reception

A Good Snowman Is Hard To Build received "universal acclaim" from professional critics according to review aggregator website Metacritic.

References

External links
 

2015 video games
Android (operating system) games
IOS games
Linux games
MacOS games
Puzzle video games
Video games developed in the United Kingdom
Windows games